Igor Valeryevich Nikitin (March 23, 1973, Ust-Kamenogorsk, Kazakh SSR) is a former Soviet-Kazakhstani hockey player, whom after the end of his playing career became a coach. He is currently the head coach of Lokomotiv Yaroslavl of the Kontinental Hockey League (KHL).

Career statistics

Regular season and playoffs

International

References

External links
 

1973 births
Living people
Sportspeople from Oskemen
Soviet ice hockey players
Kazzinc-Torpedo players
HC Lada Togliatti players
HC Neftekhimik Nizhnekamsk players
Avangard Omsk players
HC Sibir Novosibirsk players
Olympic ice hockey players of Kazakhstan
Ice hockey players at the 1998 Winter Olympics
Asian Games gold medalists for Kazakhstan
Medalists at the 1999 Asian Winter Games
Asian Games medalists in ice hockey
Ice hockey players at the 1999 Asian Winter Games